Joutsa sub-region  is a subdivision of Central Finland and one of the Sub-regions of Finland since 2009.

Municipalities
Joutsa
Luhanka

Politics
Results of the 2018 Finnish presidential election:

 Sauli Niinistö   63.3%
 Paavo Väyrynen   9.4%
 Matti Vanhanen   8.8%
 Pekka Haavisto   6.6%
 Laura Huhtasaari   6.6%
 Tuula Haatainen   3.0%
 Merja Kyllönen   1.9%
 Nils Torvalds   0.5%

Sub-regions of Finland
Geography of Central Finland